Lyman Eugene Johnson (October 24, 1811 – December 20, 1859) was an early leader in the Latter Day Saint movement and an original member of the Quorum of the Twelve Apostles. He broke with Joseph Smith and Sidney Rigdon during the 1837–38 period when schism divided the early church. Johnson later became a successful pioneer lawyer in Iowa and was one of the town fathers of Keokuk, Iowa.

Johnson was born in Pomfret, Windsor County, Vermont, to John Johnson, and Elsa Jacobs. The family moved to Hiram, Ohio, in 1818, where they established the John Johnson Farm, a successful  farm.

Johnson died in 1859, drowning in the Mississippi River in a carriage accident at Prairie du Chien, Wisconsin. He had at least five children.

Involvement in the Latter Day Saint movement

Early contact
Johnson was baptized into the Church of Christ by Sidney Rigdon in February 1831. Joseph Smith and Emma Hale Smith moved into the Johnson family home on September 12, 1831. Johnson was then ordained an elder on October 25, 1831 and a high priest of the church on November of that same year. In response to a revelation given on January 25, 1832, Johnson joined Orson Pratt on an evangelizing mission which took them through the eastern United States. The two were successful preachers and brought many converts to Mormonism on this and other missions.

Quorum of the Twelve
In the summer of 1834, Johnson marched with the Zion's Camp expedition which hoped to restore Latter Day Saints in Missouri to their lands in Jackson County. Although the expedition was a failure, many of the veterans of the expedition were soon called to high leadership positions in the church. Among these were Johnson and his brother Luke, who were among the original twelve men called on February 14, 1835, to be "Special Witnesses" or apostles in a "traveling high council" of the church, later known as the Council or Quorum of the Twelve. The chief duty of the apostles was to preside over missionary activities. Johnson continued to operate as a successful missionary from 1835 to 1837. On September 4, 1834, Johnson was married to Sarah Susan Long.

Bank failure
The failure of the Kirtland Safety Society, a bank founded by church leaders, led to widespread dissent in 1837. The church held a high council trial on September 3, 1837, which ejected Johnson, his brother Luke, and John F. Boynton from the Quorum of the Twelve. Boynton explained that his difficulties with the church resulted from "the failure of the bank" which he had understood "was instituted by the will and revelations of God, and he had been told that it would never fail". Despite these difficulties, Johnson and the others temporarily reconciled with church leaders and were restored to their apostleships on September 10, 1837, after which Johnson and his family moved to the Latter Day Saint settlement of Far West, Missouri.

Excommunications
Meanwhile, schismatic strife between the loyalist faction and the dissenting faction continued to divide the church in Kirtland. The schismatic strife followed them, but in Far West, the loyalists were able to keep control by excommunicating the leadership of the Missouri church—David Whitmer, John Whitmer, W. W. Phelps—along with Oliver Cowdery, Johnson, and others. In Johnson's case, a list of seven charges were presented to him by the Far West High Council on April 9, 1838, which included the charge of "saying he would appeal the suit between him & Brother Phineas Young and take it out of the County." Johnson replied on April 12 that "I should not condescend to put my constitutional rights at issue upon so disrespectful a point, as to answer any of those other charges until that is withdrawn & until then shall withdraw myself from your society and fellowship."

Notes

References

External links 

 Photographs of Lyman E. Johnson's headstone, L. Tom Perry Special Collections, Harold B. Lee Library, Brigham Young University
 Legal instruments relating to Mormons in Utah, L. Tom Perry Special Collections, Harold B. Lee Library, Brigham Young University
 Lyman Eugene Johnson at Find a Grave

1811 births
1859 deaths
Accidental deaths in Wisconsin
American Latter Day Saint leaders
American Latter Day Saint missionaries
Apostles of the Church of Christ (Latter Day Saints)
Converts to Mormonism
Deaths by drowning in the United States
Doctrine and Covenants people
Former Latter Day Saints
Latter Day Saint missionaries in the United States
People excommunicated by the Church of Christ (Latter Day Saints)
People from Pomfret, Vermont
People from Portage County, Ohio
Religious leaders from Vermont
Harold B. Lee Library-related 19th century articles